Mórahalom is a district in south-western part of Csongrád County. Mórahalom is also the name of the town where the district seat is found. The district is located in the Southern Great Plain Statistical Region.

Geography 
Mórahalom District borders with Kiskunmajsa District (Bács-Kiskun County) and Kistelek District to the north, Szeged District to the east, the Serbian district of North Bačka to the south, Kiskunhalas District (Bács-Kiskun County) to the west. The number of the inhabited places in Mórahalom District is 10.

Municipalities 
The district has 1 town and 9 villages.
(ordered by population, as of 1 January 2012)

The bolded municipality is the city.

Demographics

In 2011, it had a population of 28,986 and the population density was 52/km².

Ethnicity
Besides the Hungarian majority, the main minorities are the Romanian (approx. 200), German (150) and Serb (100).

Total population (2011 census): 28,986
Ethnic groups (2011 census): Identified themselves: 26,831 persons:
Hungarians: 26,127 (97.38%)
Others and indefinable: 704 (2.62%)
Approx. 2,000 persons in Mórahalom District did not declare their ethnic group at the 2011 census.

Religion
Religious adherence in the county according to 2011 census:

Catholic – 18,988 (Roman Catholic – 18,942; Greek Catholic – 44);
Reformed – 666;
Evangelical – 75;
Orthodox – 42;
other religions – 425; 
Non-religious – 2,762; 
Atheism – 228;
Undeclared – 5,800.

Gallery

See also
List of cities and towns of Hungary

References

External links
 Postal codes of the Mórahalom District

Districts in Csongrád-Csanád County